USS Ardent has been the name of more than one United States Navy ship, and may refer to: 

 , a patrol vessel and minesweeper in commission from 1917 to 1921
 , a minesweeper in commission from 1944 to 1947
 , a mine countermeasures ship in commission since 1994

United States Navy ship names